The Mara Conservancy manages the Mara Triangle, which is the northwestern part of the Maasai Mara National Reserve in Kenya.

History of Mara Conservancy 

In the year 2000 some of the local leaders became concerned about levels of mismanagement in the Mara Triangle. As a result, the Mara Conservancy, a not-for-profit management company, was established to manage the Triangle on behalf of Trans-Mara County Council.

A five-year management agreement was signed on 25 May 2001 and the Mara Conservancy started operations in the Mara Triangle on 12 June. This created the first public/private sector partnership of its kind in the region and has led to an active and cooperative partnership between conservation professionals and the local Maasai community. It has also introduced an initiative to improve the conservation and overall management of one of the most visited and well known protected areas in the world.

External links 
Mara Conservancy

National parks of Kenya
Protected areas established in 1995